Medetera is a large genus of flies in the family Dolichopodidae. It includes about 350 species worldwide. The adults are commonly found resting on vertical surfaces such as tree trunks. The larvae are predators of bark beetle larvae.

A 2011 phylogenetic analysis of Medetera and related genera found that Medetera is paraphyletic with respect to Dolichophorus, and that Thrypticus is a sister taxon to Medetera + Dolichophorus.

Species
Taxonomy follows Bickel (1985, 1987), though some of the species groups are treated as separate genera by other authors.

 nova species group:
 Medetera dominicensis Robinson, 1975
 Medetera nova Van Duzee, 1919
 Medetera xanthotricha Becker, 1922
 one undescribed species from Chiapas, Mexico

 isobellae species group:
 Medetera isobellae Bickel, 1985
 Medetera pseudonigripes Robinson, 1975

 petulca species group:
 Medetera aeneiventris Van Duzee, 1933
 Medetera aequalis Van Duzee, 1919
 Medetera albescens (Parent, 1925)
 (?)Medetera araneipes (Parent, 1929)
 Medetera chrysotimiformis Kowarz, 1868
 Medetera dorycondylus Bickel, 1985
 Medetera falcata Van Duzee, 1919
 Medetera flavirostris Negrobov, 1966
 Medetera leucarista Stackelberg, 1947
 (?)Medetera perplexa (Becker, 1917) (sometimes a synonym of Acropsilus niger (Loew, 1869))
 Medetera petulca Wheeler, 1899
 Medetera physothrix Bickel, 1985
 Medetera platythrix Bickel, 1985
 Medetera postminima Steyskal, 1967
 Medetera potomac Bickel, 1985
 Medetera prjachinae Negrobov & Stackelberg, 1972
 Medetera similis Van Duzee, 1919
 Medetera vlasovi (Stackelberg, 1937): see Asioligochaetus
 Medetera walschaertsi Gosseries, 1989 (nom. nov. for Medetera alpina Harmston & Knowlton, 1941)
 (?)Medetera turkestanica (Stackelberg, 1926)
 Medetera turkmenorum (Stackelberg, 1937)
 Medetera utahensis Bickel, 1985
 Medetera xerophila Wheeler, 1899
 Medetera zimini Negrobov, 1966

 aberrans species group (= Saccopheronta Becker, 1914):
 Medetera aberrans Wheeler, 1899
 Medetera abrupta Van Duzee, 1919
 Medetera albitarsis Van Duzee, 1931
 †Medetera amissa Bickel & Kraemer, 2016
 Medetera amplimanus Van Duzee, 1931
 Medetera archboldi Robinson, 1975
 Medetera bella Van Duzee, 1929
Medetera caffra Curran, 1927
 Medetera dilatata Becker, 1922
 Medetera excavata Becker, 1922
 Medetera flabellifera Becker, 1922
 Medetera flavides Negrobov & Thuneberg, 1970
 Medetera gomwa Bickel, 1987
Medetera hirsuticosta (Parent, 1935)
 Medetera jamaicensis Curran, 1928
 Medetera johnthomasi Bickel & Arnaud, 2011
 Medetera kandyensis Naglis & Bickel, 2012
 Medetera luzonensis Bickel, 1987
 Medetera maai Bickel, 1987
 Medetera metallina Becker, 1922
 Medetera mindanensis Bickel, 1987
 Medetera minor Becker, 1922
 Medetera montserratensis Runyon, 2020
Medetera nigra (Vanschuytbroeck, 1960)
 Medetera nigrimanus Van Duzee, 1931
Medetera nudipes (Becker, 1914)
 Medetera occidentalis Schiner, 1868
 Medetera ovata Van Duzee, 1931
 Medetera pallidicornis Van Duzee, 1929
Medetera parvilamellata (Parent, 1938)
 Medetera pedestris Becker, 1922
 Medetera peradeniya Naglis & Bickel, 2012
 Medetera planipes Van Duzee, 1919
 Medetera platychira De Meijere, 1916
 Medetera pollinosa Van Duzee, 1929
Medetera pulchra (Vanschuytbroeck, 1951)
Medetera quinta (Parent, 1936)
 Medetera scaura Van Duzee, 1929
 Medetera setosa Parent, 1931
 Medetera spinulata Parent, 1931
 Medetera steyskali Robinson, 1975
 Medetera tarsata Parent, 1931
 Medetera tritarsa Parent, 1928
 Medetera varipes Van Duzee, 1929
 Medetera viridiventris Van Duzee, 1933
 Medetera vockerothi Bickel, 1985

 melanesiana species group (= Demetera Grichanov, 2011):
 Medetera demeteri (Grichanov, 1997)
 Medetera kokodensis Bickel, 1987
 Medetera macalpinei Bickel, 1987
 Medetera malaisei Bickel, 1987
 Medetera melanesiana Bickel, 1987
 Medetera morobensis Bickel, 1987
 Medetera niuginiensis Bickel, 1987
 Medetera rhetheura Bickel, 1987

 signaticornis-pinicola species group:
 signaticornis species subgroup:
 Medetera aldrichi Wheeler, 1899
 Medetera bistriata Parent, 1929
 Medetera flinflon Bickel, 1985
 Medetera signaticornis Loew, 1857
 Medetera subsignaticornis Bickel, 1985
pinicola species subgroup:
 Medetera adjaniae Gosseries, 1989 (nom. nov. for Medetera breviseta Parent, 1927)
 Medetera fascinator Negrobov & Stackelberg, 1972

 Medetera fumida Negrobov, 1967
 Medetera gaspensis Bickel, 1985
 Medetera kinabaluensis Bickel, 1987
 Medetera maura Wheeler, 1899
 Medetera melancholica Lundbeck, 1912
 Medetera neomelancholia Bickel, 1985
 Medetera obscura (Zetterstedt, 1838)
 Medetera occultans Negrobov, 1970
 Medetera pinicola Kowarz, 1878
 Medetera polonica Negrobov & Capecki, 1977
 Medetera ravida Negrobov, 1970
 Medetera vidua Wheeler, 1899

 apicalis species group:
 Medetera abstrusa Thuneberg, 1955
 Medetera acanthura Negrobov & Thuneberg, 1970
 Medetera albens Tang, Wang & Yang, 2016
 Medetera apicalis (Zetterstedt, 1843)
 Medetera apicipes De Meijere, 1916
 Medetera austroapicalis Bickel, 1987
 Medetera baicalica Negrobov, 1972
 Medetera belgica Parent, 1936
 Medetera betulae Ringdahl, 1949
 Medetera bisecta Negrobov, 1967
 Medetera bisetifera Tang, Wang & Yang, 2016
 Medetera borealis Thuneberg, 1955
 Medetera chandleri Bickel, 1987
 Medetera curviloba Negrobov & Stackelberg, 1972
 Medetera cuspidata Collin, 1941
 Medetera cyanogaster Wheeler, 1899
 Medetera delita Negrobov & Stackelberg, 1972
 Medetera exornata Tang, Wang & Yang, 2015
 Medetera feminina Negrobov, 1967
 Medetera fissa Negrobov & Stackelberg, 1972
 Medetera furcata Curran, 1928
 Medetera furva Tang, Wang & Yang, 2015
 Medetera glauca Loew, 1869
 Medetera gracilicauda Parent, 1927
 Medetera himalayensis Bickel, 1987
 Medetera hissarica Negrobov & Stackelberg, 1972
 Medetera incisa Negrobov & Stackelberg, 1972
 Medetera impigra Collin, 1941
 Medetera kowarzi Negrobov, 1972

 Medetera liwo Bickel, 1987
 Medetera longinervis Van Duzee, 1928
 Medetera longitarsis De Meijere, 1916
 Medetera morgei Negrobov, 1971
 Medetera nepalensis Bickel, 1987
 Medetera pallipes (Zetterstedt, 1843)
 Medetera palmaris Negrobov & Stackelberg, 1972
 Medetera parenti Stackelberg, 1925
 Medetera peloria Negrobov, 1967
 Medetera pseudoapicalis Thuneberg, 1955
 Medetera pseudosibirica Bickel, 1985
 Medetera pumila De Meijere, 1916
 Medetera relicta Negrobov, 1967
 Medetera saguaroicola Bickel, 1985
 Medetera seguyi Parent, 1926
 Medetera seguyi seguyi Parent, 1926
 Medetera seguyi sphaeroidea Negrobov, 1967
 Medetera sibirica Negrobov & Stackelberg, 1972
 Medetera stomias Bickel, 1987
 Medetera subtristis Negrobov, 1970
 Medetera takagii Negrobov, 1970
 Medetera taurica Negrobov & Stackelberg, 1972
 Medetera triseta Tang, Wang & Yang, 2016
 Medetera tristis (Zetterstedt, 1838)
 Medetera tumidula Negrobov, 1967
 Medetera zaitzevi Negrobov, 1972

 crassivenis species group:
 Medetera asiatica Negrobov & Zaitzev, 1979
 Medetera crassivenis Curran, 1928
 Medetera excellens Frey, 1909
 Medetera freyi Thuneberg, 1955
 Medetera incrassata Frey, 1909
 Medetera infuscata Negrobov & Stackelberg, 1972
 Medetera inspissata Collin, 1952
 Medetera marylandica Robinson, 1967
 Medetera protuberans Negrobov, 1967
 Medetera thunebergi Negrobov, 1967
 Medetera tuberculosa Negrobov, 1972

 diadema-veles species group:
 Medetera ambigua (Zetterstedt, 1843)
 Medetera armeniaca Negrobov & Stackelberg, 1972
 Medetera arnaudi Harmston, 1951
 Medetera californiensis Wheeler, 1899
 Medetera canadensis Bickel, 1985
 Medetera capillata Negrobov & Stackelberg, 1972
 Medetera dendrobaena Kowarz, 1877
 Medetera deserticola (Stackelberg, 1926)
 Medetera diadema (Linnaeus, 1767)
 Medetera flava Tang, Wang & Yang, 2016
 Medetera flavipes Meigen, 1824
 Medetera ganshuiensis Tang, Wang & Yang, 2016
 Medetera grisescens De Meijere, 1916
 Medetera halteralis Van Duzee, 1919
 Medetera infumata Loew, 1857
 Medetera jacula (Fallén, 1823)
 Medetera kerzhneri Negrobov, 1966
 Medetera lamprostoma Loew, 1871
 Medetera lihuae Tang, Wang & Yang, 2016
 Medetera micacea Loew, 1857
 Medetera mixta Negrobov, 1967
 Medetera modesta Van Duzee, 1914
 Medetera mongolica Negrobov, 1966
 Medetera montana Negrobov, 1972
 Medetera nebulosa Negrobov & Stackelberg, 1972
 Medetera nigripes Loew, 1861
 Medetera opaca De Meijere, 1916
 Medetera paralamprostoma Negrobov & Stackelberg, 1972
 Medetera pavlovskii Negrobov & Stackelberg, 1972
 Medetera petrophila Kowarz, 1878
 Medetera plumbella Meigen, 1824
 Medetera shiae Tang, Wang & Yang, 2016
 Medetera shuimogouensis Tang, Wang & Yang, 2016
 Medetera spinulicauda Negrobov, 1970
 Medetera sinuosa Tang, Wang & Yang, 2015
 Medetera stylata Negrobov & Stackelberg, 1972
 Medetera subgrisescens Naglis & Bickel, 2012
 Medetera tenuicauda Loew, 1857
 Medetera transformata Tang, Wang & Yang, 2016
 Medetera truncorum Meigen, 1824
 Medetera tuktoyaktuk Bickel, 1985
 Medetera veles Loew, 1861
 Medetera victoris Negrobov, 1972
 Medetera vittata Van Duzee, 1919
 Medetera xiquegouensis Tang, Wang & Yang, 2016

 chillcotti species group:
 Medetera bishopae Bickel, 1987
 Medetera chillcotti Bickel, 1987

 australiana species group:
 Medetera australiana Bickel, 1987
 Medetera mosmanensis Bickel, 1987
 Medetera queenslandensis Bickel, 1987
 Medetera wongabelensis Bickel, 1987

 toxopeusi species group:
 Medetera cheesmanae Bickel, 1987
 Medetera gressitti Bickel, 1987
 Medetera irianensis Bickel, 1987
 Medetera papuensis Bickel, 1987
 Medetera toxopeusi Parent, 1932)
 Medetera vivida Becker, 1922
 Medetera waris Bickel, 1987

 gracilis species group:
 Medetera borneensis Bickel, 1987
 Medetera gracilis Parent, 1935
 Medetera penangensis Bickel, 1987
 Medetera sandakanensis Bickel, 1987

 flaviscutellum species group:
 Medetera athertonensis Bickel, 1987
 Medetera bunyensis Bickel, 1987
 Medetera colombensis Naglis & Bickel, 2012
 Medetera dorrigensis Bickel, 1987
 Medetera flaviscutellum Bickel, 1987
 Medetera gingra Bickel, 1987
 Medetera killertonensis Bickel, 1987
 Medetera philippinensis Bickel, 1987
 Medetera uda Bickel, 1987

 salomonis species group (= Medeterella Grichanov, 2011):
 Medetera austrofemoralis Bickel, 1987
 Medetera femoralis Becker, 1922
 Medetera malayensis Bickel, 1987
 Medetera mooneyensis Bickel, 1987
 Medetera nigrohalterata Parent, 1932
 Medetera olivacea De Meijere, 1916
 Medetera pospelovi Grichanov, 1997
 Medetera pseudofemoralis Bickel, 1987
 Medetera salomonis Parent, 1941

Unsorted:

Medetera abnormis Yang & Yang, 1995
Medetera adsumpta Becker, 1922
Medetera africana Grichanov, 2000
Medetera africana africana Grichanov, 2000
Medetera africana senegalensis Grichanov, 2000
Medetera albiseta Parent, 1927
Medetera albisetosa (Parent, 1925)
Medetera alexandri Negrobov, 1979
Medetera alpicola Naglis & Negrobov, 2014
Medetera altra Parent, 1931
Medetera anjudanica Grichanov & Ahmadi, 2017
Medetera annulitarsus von Roser, 1840
Medetera anus Becker, 1922
Medetera arrogans (Parent, 1927)
Medetera babelthaup Bickel, 1995
Medetera bargusinica Negrobov, 1972
Medetera bidentata Negrobov & Golubtsov, 1991
Medetera bilineata Frey, 1915
Medetera bispinosa Negrobov, 1967
Medetera brevispina Yang & Saigusa, 2001
Medetera brevitarsa Parent, 1927
Medetera brunea Negrobov, 1970
Medetera bweza Grichanov, 2000
Medetera caeruleifacies Naglis & Negrobov, 2014
Medetera calvinia Grichanov, 2000
Medetera campestris Naglis & Negrobov, 2014
Medetera capensis Curran, 1926
Medetera capitiloba Negrobov & Stackelberg, 1972
Medetera cederholmi Grichanov, 1997
Medetera chumakovi Grichanov, 1997
Medetera cimbebasia Grichanov, 2000
Medetera collarti Negrobov, 1967
Medetera complicata Negrobov, 1967
Medetera compressa Yang & Saigusa, 2001
Medetera crassicauda Robinson, 1975
Medetera curvata Yang & Saigusa, 2000
Medetera curvipyga Naglis & Negrobov, 2014
Medetera despecta Parent, 1927
Medetera dichrocera Kowarz, 1878
Medetera ealensis Parent, 1936
Medetera educata Negrobov, 1979
Medetera edwardsi Grichanov, 1997
†Medetera elegantula Meunier, 1907
Medetera emeljanovi Negrobov & Naglis, 2015
Medetera evenhuisi Yang & Yang, 1995
Medetera excipiens Becker, 1922
Medetera excisa Parent, 1914
Medetera exigua Aldrich, 1902
Medetera fasciata Frey, 1915
†Medetera flammea Meunier, 1907
Medetera flavichaeta Naglis, 2013
Medetera flavicornis Becker, 1922
Medetera flavigena Masunaga & Saigusa, 1998
Medetera flaviseta Van Duzee, 1929
Medetera flavitarsis Van Duzee, 1930
†Medetera frauendfeldi Giebel, 1856
Medetera galapagensis Bickel & Sinclair, 1997
Medetera ghesquierei Grichanov, 1999
Medetera glaucella Kowarz, 1878
Medetera glaucelloides Naglis, 2013
Medetera gotohorum Masunaga & Saigusa, 1998
Medetera grunini Negrobov, 1966
Medetera gussakovskii Negrobov, 1966
Medetera hamata Parent, 1936
Medetera helvetica Naglis & Negrobov, 2014
Medetera hymera Negrobov & Stackelberg, 1972
Medetera insignis Girschner, 1888
Medetera iviei Runyon, 2020
Medetera jakuta Negrobov & Stackelberg, 1972
Medetera japonica Negrobov, 1970
Medetera jugalis Collin, 1941
Medetera junensis Bickel, 2013
Medetera kaszabi Negrobov, 1970
Medetera krivolutskiji Negrobov, 1991
Medetera krivosheinae Negrobov, 1968
Medetera lamprostomoides Negrobov & Stackelberg, 1972
Medetera lamprostomoides kasachstanica Negrobov & Stackelberg, 1972
Medetera lamprostomoides lamprostomoides Negrobov & Stackelberg, 1972
†Medetera lasciva Meunier, 1907
Medetera latipennis Negrobov, 1970
Medetera londti Grichanov, 2000
Medetera longa Negrobov & Thuneberg, 1970
Medetera longicauda Becker, 1917
Medetera longisurstylata Maslova, Negrobov & Obona, 2018
Medetera lorea Negrobov, 1967
Medetera luteipes Masunaga & Saigusa, 1998
Medetera lvovskii Grichanov, 1999
Medetera maynei Curran, 1925
Medetera media Parent, 1925
Medetera meridionalis Negrobov, 1967
Medetera miki Negrobov, 1972
Medetera minima De Meijere, 1916
Medetera mucronata Negrobov & Golubtzov, 1991
Medetera munroi Curran, 1925
Medetera muralis Meigen, 1824
Medetera murina Becker, 1917
†Medetera mustela Meunier, 1907
Medetera nakamurai Masunaga & Saigusa, 1998
Medetera negrobovi Gosseries, 1989
Medetera neixiangensis Yang & Saigusa, 1999
Medetera nitida (Macquart, 1834)
Medetera nocturna Curran, 1927
Medetera norlingi Grichanov, 1997
Medetera normalis Curran, 1924
Medetera nubilans Negrobov & Tsurikov, 1991
Medetera nudicoxa Becker, 1922
Medetera nuwarensis Naglis & Bickel, 2012
Medetera obesa Kowarz, 1878
Medetera olegi Naglis, 2013
Medetera oscillans Allen, 1976
Medetera otiosa Parent, 1934
Medetera pachyneura Meuffels & Grootaert, 2007
Medetera pallens Negrobov, 1967
Medetera pallidior (Stackelberg, 1937)
Medetera pallidotiosa Grichanov, 2000
Medetera parvicornis Santos Abreu, 1929
Medetera penicillata Negrobov, 1970
Medetera penura Curran, 1926
Medetera perfida Parent, 1932
Medetera petrophiloides Parent, 1925
Medetera plebeia Parent, 1928
Medetera polita Parent, 1936
Medetera polleti Grichanov, 1997
Medetera praedator Curran, 1926
Medetera praedator aequatorialis Grichanov, 2000
Medetera praedator praedator Curran, 1926
Medetera pseudotiosa Grichanov, 1999
Medetera pulchrifacies Santos Abreu, 1929
Medetera rara Negrobov, 1991
Medetera rhombomium (Stackelberg, 1937)
Medetera rikhterae Grichanov, 1997
Medetera roghii Rampini & Canzoneri, 1979
Medetera rufipes Negrobov & Stackelberg, 1972
Medetera sakhalinensis Negrobov & Naglis, 2015
Medetera saxatilis Collin, 1941
Medetera seksyaevae Grichanov, 1999
Medetera senicula Kowarz, 1878
Medetera seriata Robinson, 1975
Medetera setiventris Thuneberg, 1955
Medetera sfax Grichanov, 2010
Medetera simplicis Curran, 1924
Medetera sphaeropyga Negrobov, 1972
Medetera spinigera (Stackelberg, 1937)
Medetera stackelbergiana Negrobov, 1967
Medetera stoltzei Grichanov, 1999
Medetera storai Frey, 1936
Medetera striata Parent, 1927
Medetera subchevi Grichanov, 1997
Medetera subviridis Parent, 1939
Medetera sutshanica Negrobov & Stackelberg, 1972
Medetera sylvestris (Becker, 1908)
Medetera tarasovae Negrobov, 1972
Medetera ticinensis Naglis & Negrobov, 2014
†Medetera totolapa Bickel & Kraemer, 2016
Medetera tropica Negrobov, 1991
Medetera tuberculata Negrobov, 1966
Medetera unicolor Becker, 1922
Medetera unisetosa (Collin, 1941)
Medetera ussuriana Negrobov, 1972
Medetera vaalensis Grichanov, 2000
Medetera vagans Becker, 1917
Medetera valaisensis Naglis & Negrobov, 2014
†Medetera vana Meunier, 1907
Medetera varitibia Parent, 1935
Medetera varvara Grichanov & Vikhrev, 2009
Medetera verae Negrobov, 1967
Medetera viridicolor Becker, 1922
Medetera xizangensis Yang, 1999
Medetera yangi Zhu, Yang & Masunaga, 2006
Medetera yunnanensis Yang & Saigusa, 2001
Medetera zhejiangensis Yang & Yang, 1995
Medetera zinovjevi Negrobov, 1967

The following species are nomina dubia:
 Medetera comes Hardy, 1939 (type material lost, possibly a member of the australiana group)
 Medetera extranea Becker, 1922 (type material lost, unplaced to genus)

The following species are synonyms of other species:
Medetera afra Curran, 1927: Synonym of Medetera simplicis Curran, 1924
Medetera carnivora Fischer von Waldheim, 1819: Synonym of Medetera diadema (Linnaeus, 1767)
Medetera cilifemorata Van Duzee, 1933: Synonym of Medetera grisescens De Meijere, 1916
Medetera collini Thuneberg, 1955: Synonym of Medetera parenti Stackelberg, 1925
Medetera cryophora Séguy, 1963: Synonym of Medetera murina Becker, 1917
Medetera dendrophila Becker, 1917: Synonym of Medetera pallipes (Zetterstedt, 1843)
Medetera hawaiiensis Van Duzee, 1933: Synonym of Medetera grisescens De Meijere, 1916
Medetera idahoensis Harmston & Knowlton, 1943: Synonym of Medetera crassivenis Curran, 1928
Medetera intermedia Van Duzee, 1928: Synonym of Medetera veles Loew, 1861
Medetera lachaisei Couturier, 1986: Synonym of Dolichophorus luteoscutatus (Parent, 1936)
Medetera longimana Van Duzee, 1933: Synonym of Medetera californiensis Wheeler, 1899
Medetera minuta von Roser, 1840: Synonym of Medetera plumbella Meigen, 1824
Medetera nigricans Meigen, 1824: Synonym of Medetera jacula (Fallén, 1823)
Medetera nuortevai Thuneberg, 1955: Synonym of Medetera pinicola Kowarz, 1878
Medetera obsoleta Negrobov & Thuneberg, 1971: Synonym of Medetera aeneiventris Van Duzee, 1933
Medetera orbiculata Van Duzee, 1932: Synonym of Medetera apicalis (Zetterstedt, 1843)
Medetera palmae Hardy, 1939: Synonym of Medetera grisescens De Meijere, 1916
Medetera piceae Ounap, 1997: Synonym of Medetera pinicola Kowarz, 1878
Medetera robusta Loew, 1857: Synonym of Medetera obscura (Zetterstedt, 1838)
Medetera robusta Ounap, 1997: Synonym of Medetera obscura (Zetterstedt, 1838)
Medetera ruficornis Strobl, 1898: Renamed to Medetera negrobovi Gosseries, 1989
Medetera rutilans Parent, 1935: Synonym of Medetera maynei Curran, 1925
Medetera sinuata Parent, 1928: Synonym of Coeloglutus concavus Aldrich, 1896
Medetera subglauca Becker, 1917: Synonym of Medetera signaticornis Loew, 1857
Medetera tertia Becker, 1917: Synonym of Medetera muralis Meigen, 1824
Medetera turneri Parent, 1934: Synonym of Medetera caffra (Curran, 1927)
Medetera vanschuytbroecki Gosseries, 1989: Synonym of Medetera arnaudi Negrobov, Vanschuytbroeck & Grichanov, 1981
Medetera wheeleri Foote, Coulson & Robinson, 1965: Synonym of Medetera veles Loew, 1861
Medetera zairensis Dyte & Smith, 1980: Synonym of Medetera caffra (Curran, 1927)

The following species have been moved to other genera:
Medetera luteoscutata Parent, 1936: moved to Dolichophorus
Medetera vegrandis Frey, 1925: moved to Micromorphus

References 

Dolichopodidae genera
Medeterinae
Articles containing video clips
Taxa named by Gotthelf Fischer von Waldheim